SKA, Ska or ska may refer to:

 Acharnes Railway Center, station in Athens, Greece
 Armed Forces Office (Germany) (Streitkräfteamt)
 Shotokan Karate of America
 Ska, a style of music
 Ska (leafhopper), a leafhopper genus in the tribe Erythroneurini
 The Ska, a fictional ethnic group from the Lyonesse Trilogy by Jack Vance
 SKA Brewing, Durango, Colorado, US
 Ska-P, a Spanish ska punk band
 Square Kilometre Array, a radiotelescope project
 Sachkhoj Academy, a Sikh academy
 Sparse Kogge–Stone adder in computing
 Ska Keller (born 1981) German politician

Army sports clubs 
 Armed Forces (sports society), SKA (Cyrillic: СКА, for "Sports Club of the Army"), in USSR countries 

Kyrgyzstan
 Shoro-SKA Bishkek, now FC Alga Bishkek, a Kyrgyz football club

Russia
 FC SKA-Energiya Khabarovsk, a Russian football club
 FC SKA Rostov-on-Don, a Russian football club
 HC SKA Khabarovsk, a Russian ice hockey club
 SKA-Neftyanik, a Russian bandy club
 SKA Saint Petersburg, a Russian ice hockey club
 SKA-Sverdlovsk, a Russian bandy club

Tajikistan
 SKA-Hatlon Farhor, a Tajik football club

Ukraine
 SKA Lviv
 SKA Odesa

See also 
 CSKA (disambiguation), USSR Central Sports Clubs of the Army